Ensuring Secure Seas: Indian Maritime Security Strategy (IMSS-2015 or Strategy-2015) is a document published under India's Integrated Headquarters outlining the nation's updated thinking towards its naval considerations. The previous edition Freedom to Use the Seas: India's Maritime Military Strategy (IMMS-2007) was published in 2007.

Primary areas of national interest have been expanded to include a larger portion of the Indian Ocean. Secondary areas such as the Mediterranean Sea have been included. Naval power will be built towards three carrier battle groups. Ballistic missile submarines will aid in sustainable and continuous nuclear deterrence and assured destruction. The strategy mentions international concepts and law such as freedom of navigation and United Nations Convention on the Law of the Sea, and that counter-piracy and humanitarian efforts will increase.

The document acknowledges the labyrinth of dynamic geopolitical linkages. Organized crime, climate change and natural disasters have been considered. The document briefly lists other national projects and initiatives Project Mausam and Security and Growth for All in the Region (SAGAR).

Commentary 
With regard to maritime law, India will need to walk the talk, taking cue from its own arbitration award with Bangladesh. The elucidation of "net security provider" in the Indian Ocean doubles down on the phrase and remains a challenge even within the limits of the northern Indian Ocean. 

Strategy-2015 has been called "assertive" as compared to its "conservative" predecessor, however the document does not go into detail how naval dominance will be attained and only portrays the general role of carrier battle groups during conflict.

Related publications 

 Indian Maritime Doctrine 2004; Indian Naval Book of Reference
 Indian Maritime Doctrine 2009; Naval Strategic Publication 1.1
 Indian Maritime Doctrine 2015;

References

Further  
 
 
 
 
 

Indian Navy
National security of India
Military of India
Indian non-fiction books